La Mata is a town in the Veraguas province of Panama.

Populated places in Veraguas Province